Volker Diehl (born 28 May 1957 in Neheim-Hüsten) is a German gallery owner. He mainly exhibits contemporary art in the gallery "DIEHL" (Berlin).

Biography and career
After graduating from high school in Warstein in 1977, Volker Diehl first studied at the Kunstakademie Münster under Hans-Jürgen Breuste, and from 1978 art history at the Free University of Berlin. In West Berlin, he supported various artists as part of the DAAD Artists-in-Berlin Program (including Markus Raetz, André Thomkins, Wolf Vostell, Dieter Hacker) and got to know René Block in this context. At the exhibition "Für Augen und Ohren" curated by Block, which was first shown at the Academy of Arts, Berlin, and then at the Musée d'Art Moderne de la Ville de Paris, he was also responsible for the support of artists and thus got to know Joseph Beuys, Nam June Paik, Joe Jones, and many other artists. A little later he became assistant to Shigeko Kubota and ran her studio. From 1981 to 1983 he was assistant to Christos M. Joachimides and Norman Rosenthal. In this context, he supported the artists and worked as personal assistant in the exhibition Zeitgeist (1982), which was "arguably one of the most historically significant global painting surveys of the 20th century". Together with Roland Hagenberg, he subsequently published the two books Maler in Berlin (1982) and the sequel ... Und (1983) in their own publishing house "HAPPY-HAPPY", which contained numerous interviews and portraits of artists and collectors, among them Anselm Kiefer, Georg Baselitz and Erich Marx as well as representatives of the art groups Neue Wilde and Arte Cifra. With Roland Hagenberg he traveled New York City, where they conducted interviews with Andy Warhol, Robert Mapplethorpe, Keith Haring, Francesco Clemente, Julian Schnabel, Robert Morris, Jean-Michel Basquiat, Leo Castelli, Ileana Sonnabend, Mary Boone, Tony Shafrazi, and many more. The tapes used turned out later to be defective, so the interviews were never published.

Activities as gallery owner
In 1983 he began to curate exhibitions at the "Galerie Folker Skulima" in Berlin as a junior partner and showed young, contemporary artists including Jaume Plensa, Rosemarie Trockel, Leiko Ikemura, Sergey Volkov, Ray Smith and Martin Assig. In September 1990 he took over the rooms at Niebuhrstr. 2 with the founding of "Galerie Volker Diehl". In 2000 he moved to new rooms at Zimmerstr. in Berlin-Mitte, in 2007 to Lindenstraße in the Kreuzberg district. In autumn 2011 the gallery moved back to the former space at Niebuhrstraße in Berlin-Charlottenburg. In September 2013, a project space was added under the name "Diehl Cube" in Emser Straße in Berlin-Wilmersdorf, in which exhibitions were shown until 2018.

In addition, Diehl was the first western gallery owner to open its own exhibition space in Moscow under the name "Diehl + Gallery One" in April 2008. In the former premises of the state Soviet art trade at Smolenskaja No. 5/13, Diehl exhibited the works of the American artist Jenny Holzer under the title Like truth as the first project from April 17 to June 15, 2008. After other exhibitions by Wim Delvoye, Zhang Huan, Jaume Plensa and Olga Chernysheva, the Moscow branch closed again at the end of 2009.

Under the name "Diehl Projects" Diehl was responsible for further projects, first around 2000 and 2007/2008 in Berlin, later for the exhibition of the Russian artist Olga Chernysheva Adventure Istiklal N. 9 in the "Yapi Kredi Kazim Taskent Art Gallery" in Istanbul (2009) and two group exhibitions in Rostov-on-Don with the titles Berlin tut gut! and Pubblico – Privato (spring 2012).

Other projects
In 1996 he and 13 other gallery owners were founding members of the art fair "art forum berlin" and, together with Rudolf Kicken, also managed the business of the company until 2001. It was internationally the first exclusively contemporary art fair and the first fair in the world to be conceived and conducted by gallery owners.

With Margarita Pushkina and Vlad Ovcharenko, he established the Russian art fair "Cosmoscow" in 2010 with an "all-inclusive concept". In 2016, together with Elena Sereda and Natalia Chagoubatova, he also founded the London pop-up company "Art Circle" (curation by Bettina Ruhrberg, among others).

Exhibitions (selection)

1983–1990 in Galerie Folker Skulima 
 Georg Baselitz, 1983
 Karl Horst Hödicke, 1983
 Helmut Middendorf, 1984
 Emil Schumacher, 1984
 Christian Hasucha, 1984
 Klaus Karl Mehrkens, 1985
 Erwin Bohatsch, 1985
 Gianni Dessi, 1985
 Leiko Ikemura, 1985
 Pizzi Cannella, 1985
 Rosemarie Trockel, 1985/1986
 Erwin Bohatsch, 1986
 William Turnbull, 1987
 Gotthard Graubner, 1988
 Christian Ludwig Attersee, Errötende Tiere, 1989
 Martin Assig, 1990
 Gerhard Merz, 1990
 Gerhard Richter, Grafik und Multiples 1966–1989, 1990

Galerie Volker Diehl in Berlin
 Markus Lüpertz, 1990
 Martin Assig, 1990
 Donald Judd, 1991
 David Deutsch, 1991
 Claudia Hart, 1992
 Walter Dahn, A. R. Penck, Rosemarie Trockel, Collectiv No. 1, 1992/1993
 Angela Dwyer, Neue Bilder, 1995
 Christoph M. Gais, 1995
 Leiko Ikemura, 1995
 Group show: Magnus von Plessen, Fergus Bremner, 1996
 Martin Assig, 1997
 Jaume Plensa, Projekte auf Papier, 1997
 Jaume Plensa, Wie ein Hauch, 1997
 Magnus von Plessen, S.A.L.I.G.I.A., 1997
 John Noel Smith, 1998
 Matthias Müller, Film und Photographie, 2001
 Alice Stepanek, Steven Maslin, Bodenlos, 2002
 Jaume Plensa, Crown Fountain, 2002
 Birgit Dieker, Kardio, 2002/2003
 Zhang Huan, Photographie und Video, 2003
 Frauke Eigen, Illusion Allusion, 2004/2005
 The Blue Noses Group, (Slava Mizin und Sasha Shaburov from Novosibirsk) The Blue Noses, 2005/2006
 Susan Hiller, Outlaws and Curiosities, 2006
 Martin Borowski, Homestory, 2007
 Hye Rim Lee, Crystal City, 2008
 Alexei Wiktorowitsch Kallima, Closed Party, 2008/2009
 Olga Chernysheva, Caesuras, 2009
 Susan Hefuna, Hefuna / Hefuna, 2009
 Thomas Florschuetz, Durchsicht, 2012
 Sergey Bratkov, Chapiteau Moscow, 2013
 Grazia Varisco, Se… 1959–2014, 2014
 Turi Simeti. Alcamo, 2015
 Tomás Maldonado, Werke/Opere 2000–2015, 2015
 Alliance 22, Monochromia, 2016
 Amélie Grözinger, Solid Matter 2.0, 2017
 Simon English, I am not Justin Beiber, 2017/2018
 KP Brehmer, Zweimal täglich Zähneputzen, 2018/2019

Diehl + Gallery One in Moscow
 Jenny Holzer, Like truth, 2008
 Wim Delvoye, New Works, 2008
 Group show: Laughterlife – New Art from Russia and Central Asia, 2008
 Zhang Huan, Paintings and Sculptures, 2008/2009
 Jaume Plensa, Silent Music, 2009
 David Ter-Oganyan, Aleksandra Galkina, Scale, 2009
 Group show: Glasnost. Soviet Non-Conformist Art from the 1980s, 2010
 in cooperation with Baibakov Art Projects: Olga Chernysheva, Participation in Modernikon – Contemporary Art from Russia, 2011

Diehl Cube
 Constantin Flondor, Über einige Flächen mit gemeinsamen Ebenen, 2013
 Gonn Mosny, Above the Line – Atmen und Malen, 2013/2014
 Homage to Lucio Amelio, The Early Hacker 1960–70, 2014
 Carla Guagliardi, Fuga, 2014
 Mark Lammert, Floaters, 2015
 James Lee Byars, The Secret Archive. Dieter Hacker Collection. Curated by Mark Gisbourne, 2014
 Nanda Vigo, Zero in the Mirror, 2015
 Ivan Gorshokov, The Way of King’s Pie, 2015
 Anastasia Khoroshilova, Die Übrigen 2015
 Alexander Rodchenko, Jump, 2017
 Hartmut Böhm, Objects in Dialogue, 2017

Publications (selection)

 Christos M. Joachimides (Ed.): Zeitgeist. Edited by Ursula Prinz u. Volker Diehl. Berlin: Frölich & Kaufmann, 1982 (in German).
 Volker Diehl, Roland Hagenberg (Eds.): Maler in Berlin. Berlin: HAPPY-HAPPY, [1982] (in German).
 Volker Diehl, Roland Hagenberg (Eds.): ... Und. Berlin: HAPPY-HAPPY, [1983] (in German).
 Volker Diehl (Ed.): Martin Assig. Berlin: Galerie Volker Diehl, 1990 (in German).
 Andy Warhol: Flowers. New York, Berlin: Stellan Holm Gallery, Galerie Volker Diehl, 1994.
 Galerie Großinsky & Brümmer, Galerie Volker Diehl (Eds.): Martin Assig. Karlsruhe and Berlin: Galerie Großinsky & Brümmer and Galerie Volker Diehl, 1997 (in German.
 Jaume Plensa: Wie ein Hauch. Berlin: Galerie Volker Diehl, 1998 (in German).
 Susan Hiller: The curiosities of Sigmund Freud. Berlin: Galerie Volker Diehl, 2006.
 Zhang Huan: Drawings – On the Occasion of the Exhibition Zhang Huan – Drawings, at Galerie Volker Diehl, Berlin, March 10 to April 10, 2007. München: Schirmer/Mosel, 2007.
 Martin Borowski: Homestory Visitation. Berlin: Galerie Volker Diehl, 2007.
 Ling Jian: The Last Idealism. Berlin: Galerie Volker Diehl, 2007.
 Martin Assig: Westwerk Havelhaus. Berlin and München: Galerie Volker Diehl and Schirmer/Mosel, 2008 (in German).
 Olga Chernysheva, Boris Groys: Caesuras. Berlin: Galerie Volker Diehl, 2009.
 Joseph Backstein, Ekaterina Degot, Boris Groys: Glasnost – Soviet Non-Conformist Art from the 1980s. Haunch of Venision; London: Galerie Volker Diehl, 2010.
 Christian Megert: Licht und Bewegung. Berlin: Galerie Volker Diehl, 2013 (in German).
 Peter Sedgley: Singing Light. Berlin: Diehl, 2014.
 Rolf-Gunter Dienst: Primavera. Berlin: Volker Diehl, Allegra Ravizza, 2015, .
 Ralf Hanselle, Volker Diehl, Stefan Heyne: Prime Time – archetypes of abstraction in photography. Berlin: Galerie Volker Diehl, 2016, .
 Julia Nefedova, Lena Vazhenina: Internet doesn’t allow me to forget you. Berlin: Galerie Volker Diehl, 2016, .
 Simon English: My Big Self Decoy Justin Beiber. London: Black Dog Publishing, 2017.
 Tiberiy Szilvashi: Rembrandt-Zoom – Melancholie als Alchemie der Malerei. Published by Volker Diehl. Berlin: ciconia ciconia, 2019 (in German).

Further reading
 Julika Kehb, Natascha Kirchner, Esther Knuth: Galerieprofil Volker Diehl – Härte und Brutalität. In: KUNST Magazin 1307/08, p. 12–17 (in German).
 Odrija Fišere: At the end, the artwork survives : An interview with German gallerist Volker Diehl. In: Arterritory.com, 12. August 2016.

References

External links
 Galerie Volker Diehl website
 Galerie Volker Diehl on ArtFacts.Net
 

1957 births
German art dealers
Living people
Contemporary art galleries in Germany
Art galleries established in 1990